Call-through telecom companies are alternative telecommunications companies in Europe that provide services to make inexpensive international phone calls. All a user needs to do to take advantage of these savings is to dial the call-through access number followed by the destination number. Different phone companies specializes in a different types of international phone call deals, which means that the cheap long-distance call plan that works for one country won't necessarily work for another. Most call-through telecom companies charge different telephone call prices at different times of day for local and national calls while others offer really cheap international phone calls (from as little as 0.5p or 1p per minute in the UK, as a local call rate for the international phone call in Ireland and France, 2c a minute, even free, in Austria and Germany etc.).

These call-through telecom companies require no signup or account; they don't require a credit card, and users do not need to change their phone provider, purchase any special devices or even buy a phone card.

Call-through companies frequently update their rates, thereby making it imperative for users to get a view on rates across the market before calling.

Technology
Call-through telecom providers use Voice over IP (VoIP) call termination to connect the caller to the recipient. Most of the call is carried over IP network, where cost of carrying of the audio signal is cheaper than traditional phone carriers. The calls that are initiated on the Internet (e.g. Skype) use VoIP. These calls can terminate at other point on Internet or even at the point, which is not on the Internet, e.g. traditional telephone line - this is known as call termination. The calls do not have to originate on Internet in order to use VoIP. A caller can dial a physical phone number, which is then routed over VoIP to the point when it is terminated at the recipient's physical phone line (fixed landline or wireless mobile or cell line), even in another country. This is what call-through telecom operators do - they provide call termination at both ends of the call.

Austria
There are several cheap call-through numbers in Austria, for example toolani.

Germany
Quite a lot of call-through companies are active in the German market, typically offering their services via 0180 Shared Cost Service numbers charged at 0.039 € to 0.14 € per minute from German landlines, and up to 0.42 € per minute from German mobile phones.

UK
In the UK, most call-through access services use non-geographic revenue share 0843, 0844, 0871 and 0872 numbers or premium rate 0905, 0906 and 0911 numbers. The revenue share or "service charge" part of the price paid is set by the terminating telecoms company. This in turn depends on the exact number dialled. The lowest rates are on 084 numbers, higher on 087 numbers and the highest rates are on 09 numbers. In a small number of cases, the "service charge"  may vary based on the time of the day. Prices also vary according to the "access charge" added by the originating telecoms company. Additionally, the access charge levied on a call from a mobile telephone will be a lot more than from a landline.

External links
United Kingdom of Great Britain
Cheap international calls from UK compared
Comparison of international call providers from UK

Telecommunications companies